American Woman is a 2019 drama film written and directed by Semi Chellas, in her feature directorial debut. It stars Hong Chau, Sarah Gadon, John Gallagher Jr., Lola Kirke, David Cubitt, Jordan Pettle, Richard Walters and Ellen Burstyn. Based on the 2003 novel of the same title by Susan Choi, the film is a fictional account of Wendy Yoshimura, the real-life woman who cared for heiress Patty Hearst after she was abducted.

It had its world premiere at the Tribeca Film Festival on April 28, 2019, was released in Canada on June 30, 2020, by Elevation Pictures.

Plot

Adept at living off the grid ever since she masterminded an act of violence against the American government, 25-year-old former radical Jenny Shimada agrees to take care of three fugitives who are on the run. One of the three fugitives happens to be the kidnapped granddaughter of a wealthy newspaper magnate and has become a national celebrity for embracing her captors’ ideology and joining their revolutionary cell.

Cast

 Hong Chau as Jenny
 Sarah Gadon as Pauline
 John Gallagher Jr. as Juan
 Lola Kirke as Yvonne
 Ellen Burstyn as Miss Dolly
 David Cubitt as Agent John Spivey
 Jordan Pettle as Rob Frazer
 Richard Walters as Thomas

Production
In September 2017, it was announced Hong Chau had joined the cast of the film, with Semi Chellas directing from a screenplay she wrote. Killer Films was announced as producing the film.

Release
The film had its world premiere at the Tribeca Film Festival on April 28, 2019. It had a gala premiere at the Toronto International Film Festival in September 2019.

Reception 
The Globe and Mail calls it a "Canadian heist thriller American Woman knows when to simmer and when to boil over."

It competed in the Calgary International Film Festival in 2019, where it was awarded a Special Jury Mention for Acting. It also won Best Picture, Best Director (Semi Chellas), Best Actress (Hong Chau), and Best Cinematography (Gregory Middleton) at the Downtown Los Angeles Film Festival in 2019.

References

External links
 
 

2019 films
2019 drama films
American drama films
Canadian drama films
Cultural depictions of Patty Hearst
English-language Canadian films
Films set in the 1970s
Killer Films films
Films directed by Semi Chellas
2010s English-language films
2010s American films
2010s Canadian films
2019 independent films
2019 directorial debut films